The non-metropolitan county of Cleveland was created under the Local Government Act 1972, which came into effect on 1 April 1974, comprising the urban areas around the mouth of the River Tees, previously parts of the administrative counties of Durham and North Riding of Yorkshire. Although it was abolished in 1996, the four unitary authorities which succeeded it (Hartlepool, Middlesbrough, Redcar and Cleveland, and Stockton-on-Tees) have been considered together for the purposes of reviewing parliamentary boundaries. The area has returned 6 MPs to the UK Parliament since 1983.

Constituencies timeline 

1 From 1974 to 1983, these constituencies were formally named as sub-divisions of the County Borough of Teesside.

Boundary reviews

1974 
At the time of its creation, Cleveland contained the equivalent of approximately 6 constituencies: four boroughs contained within the County Borough of Teesside, namely Stockton, Thornaby, Middlesbrough and Redcar; Hartlepool in the county of Durham; and the majority of Cleveland and Whitby in the North Riding of Yorkshire. It also contained small areas of Easington and Richmond (Yorks).

1983 
The next change to parliamentary constituency boundaries, following the recommendations of the Third Periodic Review of Westminster constituencies, reflected the change in county boundaries and reorganisation of local government authorities in 1974. The review did not come into effect for a further nine years, at the 1983 general election.

The new constituency of Stockton North comprised the majority of the abolished Stockton constituency, including Billingham, Norton and the town centre of Stockton-on-Tees. The new constituency of Stockton South was based on the abolished constituency of Thornaby and included Thornaby-on-Tees and three wards in the borough of Middlesbrough. It also included parts of the old Stockton seat, parts transferred from Easington in Durham (Egglescliffe) and parts transferred from Richmond (Yorks) (Ingleby Barwick and Yarm).
Middlesbrough gained some areas of the old Thornaby seat, including Acklam and Linthorpe, but lost southern areas, including Marton, to Langbaurgh. This new constituency was based on the “Cleveland” part of the abolished Cleveland and Whitby, with Whitby and surrounding rural areas being transferred to Scarborough in North Yorkshire.

There were only minor changes to Hartlepool and Redcar was unchanged.

1997 
Under the Fourth Periodic Review, the three Middlesbrough borough wards (Ayresome, Brockfield and Kader) in Stockton South were transferred to the Middlesbrough constituency.

Markse-by-the-Sea was transferred to Redcar from Langbaurgh, which was renamed Middlesbrough South and East Cleveland.

2010 
At the Fifth Review there were only minor changes due to the revision of local authority ward boundaries.

Maps

Communities timeline 
The table below shows which constituencies represented selected communities within the current county from 1885 onwards.

See also 

 List of parliamentary constituencies in Cleveland
 History of parliamentary constituencies and boundaries in Durham

References

Cleveland, England
Yorkshire